Pavle (Paul; 11 September 1914 – 15 November 2009) was the patriarch of the Serbian Orthodox Church from 1990 to his death. His full title was His Holiness the Archbishop of Peć, Metropolitan of Belgrade and Karlovci, and Serbian Patriarch Pavle. Before his death, he was the oldest living leader of an Eastern Orthodox church. Because of poor health, he spent his last years in the Military Medical Academy in Belgrade, while his duties were carried out by Metropolitan Amfilohije.

Early life
Pavle was born as Gojko Stojčević (Гојко Стојчевић) in the village of Kućanci near Magadenovac, then part of Austria-Hungary (present-day Croatia). He lost both of his parents in childhood, and was raised by an aunt. After finishing elementary school, Pavle graduated from a gymnasium in Belgrade, then studied at the seminary in Sarajevo. After finished Seminary, Gojko entered University of Belgrade where he studied Theology and Medicine in parallel. He quit medicine, but graduated with a Theology degree in 1942. During World War II he took refuge in the Holy Trinity monastery in Ovčar, and later moved to Belgrade. During 1944, he was employed as a teacher and educator at the refugee children's home in Bosnia in Banja Koviljaca. When the children were running on the river, one boy started to drown and Gojko jumped into the cold water to help him. Soon he was seriously ill "on the lungs" and doctors believed that was tuberculosis predicted him another three months of his life. He then went to the Vujan Monastery where he lived for some time isolated from other monks and managed to cure this disease. In gratitude, he carved and donated a wooden cross to the monastery with crucifixion. After the war, he worked in Belgrade as a construction worker, but because of his poor health he took monastic vows in Blagoveštenje monastery in Ovčar in 1946. His monastic name became Pavle (Paul). He served as a hierodeacon in Blagoveštenje, and later in Rača monastery between 1949 and 1955. In 1954, Pavle was ordained to the rank of hieromonk. The same year he was ordained as protosyncellus, and in 1957 as archimandrite.

Between 1955 and 1957 Pavle took post-graduate studies in the Theological School of the University of Athens, Greece. He received a doctorate in New Testament and liturgy by the Theological Academy in Athens. After returning from Greece, he was elected the Bishop of Ras and Prizren (the eparchy which includes all of Kosovo) in 1957. He held that position for 33 years before he was elected Patriarch.

As a religious leader
As a bishop of Ras and Prizren Pavle built numerous new churches and helped the reconstruction of old ones. He spent a lot of time in traveling and meeting with people of his eparchy. He also wrote books and gave lectures in Church music and Church Slavonic language.

Yugoslav Wars
After spending 34 years in Kosovo, Pavle was elected the Serbian Patriarch in 1990, succeeding the ill Serbian Patriarch German, and moved to Belgrade. He was ordained for the Patriarch in the St. Michael's Cathedral in Belgrade on 2 December 1990, and in Patriarchal Monastery of Peć, the ancient seat of the Serbian Church, on 22 May 1994. Six days after his election, the parliamentary election was held in Serbia, in which Slobodan Milošević's SPS came to power. At first, relations between the government and the church were good, but gradually eroded because of the Yugoslav Wars and ongoing crisis in Serbia. Pavle had connections to the Karić family and had numerous meetings with Milošević and Mira Marković, but also with the leaders of the opposition. In 1993 Pavle wrote a letter to Milošević urging him to release Vuk Drašković from prison.

During the Yugoslav Wars, the patriarch and the church gave support to the leaders of the Bosnian Serbs (Republika Srpska) and Croatian Serbs (Republic of Srpska Krajina). Patriarch Pavle had been heavily criticized for his actions during the wars. The Orthodox church has been viewed as promoters of Serbian nationalism by many Bosnian Muslims and Croats. Pavle visited the cities of Knin, Pale while Serbian troops carried out a siege on Goražde. Pavle met with Serb paramilitary leader, Arkan, who he claimed was justified in his actions and presented him with an autographed icon of Saint Nicholas; Arkan considered himself a favorite of Pavle and regarded the patriarch as  his "commander", stating that "we are fighting for our religion, the Serbian Orthodox Church."

On 13 December 1991, Pavle wrote a letter which circulated to all Orthodox churches urging for the protection of Croatian Serbs from "the Croatian neo-fascist regime - the successor of the Ustašas who massacred 700,000 Orthodox Serbs in World War II." He openly referred to the Republic of Croatia as the "new Independent State of Croatia" and justified the war as "righteous".

During the Bosnian War, Pavle supported the President of Republika Srpska, Radovan Karadžić, in his rejection of the Vance-Owen peace plan and supported Karadžić in his claims that there were no Serbian rape camps that kept Muslim women, but accused Bosnian Muslims and Croats of the same thing. A famous photograph from this time is that of Karadžić kissing Pavle's hand. In May 1993, Pavle received a letter from Karadžić which thanked him for his "advice and support" in the Bosnian Serbs' "just battle". Karadžić regarded the Serbian Church as the "only spiritual force capable of uniting the Serb nation, regardless of borders." In 1994, Pavle claimed that Serbs were native to Bosnia and Herzegovina and that Bosniaks had only arrived there when the Ottomans invaded.

When a swift Croatian offensive in May 1995 put western Slavonia region back into Croatian control, he urgently called Slobodan Milošević, asking if he will defend Serbia's "brethren in need". On 31 July 1995, he traveled to the Krajina capital Knin with Ratko Mladić (currently on trial for war crimes and genocide by the International Criminal Tribunal for the former Yugoslavia), to assure the rebel Serbs of military and religious support. However, Krajina ceased to exist just three months later, following Operation Storm that resulted in 200,000–250,000 Serbian refugees.In September 1997, Pavle signed a declaration to the UN Security Council which demanded suspension of the proceedings against Karadžić before the Hague tribunal. Pavle urged Belgrade not to give up Karadžić and Mladić, indicted for war crimes, to the ICTY. He and other nationalist intellectuals also signed a declaration demanding their pardon.

In 1998, Pavle was invited to Zagreb by Croatian Archbishop Josip Bozanić for talks on peace where he was snubbed by several leading Croatian party members and Christian groups for his and the Orthodox Church's role with the rebel Serbs during the war.

After the launch of NATO deployment into Kosovo and Pristina in June 1999, Norwegian special force soldiers escorted Pavle from Pristina to the Patriarchal Monastery of Peć in the city of Peć. The escort mission was regarded to possibly be provocative so soon after the atrocities in the area in question and there were fears of a possible assassination. The patriarch and the Norwegian soldiers were attacked several times on their way.

1996–1997 protests in Serbia
In 1997 Pavle took part in the massive anti-government protests in Belgrade. On 27 January (St Sava Day) he led the protesters to break the police  cordon in Kolarčeva street. This was the first time that Pavle openly confronted Milošević's government.  Although in following years he became close to the opposition leaders and confronted Milošević, Pavle took part in the 1999 Republic Day celebration where he congratulated Milošević. Pavle later apologized and said that it was misinterpreted. After this, the relations between Pavle and Milošević hit new lows. In 2000, Milošević didn't send Pavle Christmas congratulations for the first time. Pavle later called Milošević and his government responsible for the Yugoslav catastrophe and asked him to resign. After the change of power in Serbia, Pavle continued to cooperate with the government, and was a frequent guest at various political ceremonies.

Later years

Pavle was referred to by some as the "walking saint" based on his simple lifestyle and personal humility. All of the bishops of the Serbian Orthodox Church had cars, which they used to travel through their dioceses, except Pavle. When asked why he'd never owned a car, he replied: "I will not purchase one until every Albanian and Serb household in Kosovo and Metohija has an automobile." Asked by foreign journalists about alleged Church support to the Greater Serbian project, Pavle answered:

In his tenure as the Patriarch he healed the schism with the "Free Serbian Orthodox Church", now known as the New Gračanica Metropolitanate, and he made efforts to heal the ongoing schism in Macedonia with the Macedonian Orthodox Church, which was considered uncanonical by the Ecumenical Patriarchate and all other Eastern Orthodox churches. During his term, he visited numerous eparchies of the Serbian Orthodox Church abroad. He visited Australia, United States, Canada and Western Europe. He visited Russia, and was also a guest at the United Nations Headquarters in New York City and at the White House.

Patriarch Pavle was the oldest among all living Patriarchs. He was especially devoted to and fond of the words of the Apostle Paul (after whom he was named Pavle), whom he often quoted and expressed admiration for.

In October 2004, Pavle wrote an open letter in which he denounced the elections in Kosovo and urged Serbs to boycott the polls.

On 27 April 2007, the Holy Synod announced that it had named the Metropolitan of Zagreb, Ljubljana and all Italy, Jovan, as the Guardian of the throne (taking over the Patriarch's duties temporarily) while patriarch Pavle was recovering in Sveti Sava Hospital. He was discharged on 1 May and returned to his duties on 14 May. The Patriarch's health worsened and he was restricted to a wheelchair. On 13 November 2007 Pavle was admitted to a medical clinic, and the Metropolitan of Montenegro and the Littoral Amfilohije Radović, as the oldest member, was elected by the Holy Synod to conduct the duties of the Patriarch. On 20 November 2007 it was announced that his life was in danger. On 17 May 2008 the Holy Synod took over all Patriarch Pavle's duties owing to his inability to carry out his functions. On 12 October 2008 Pavle was reported to have asked the Holy Synod to accept his resignation because of declining physical ability. On 11 November 2008, the Holy Synod decided to turn down his request and to ask him to remain on the throne for life.

Death

Pavle died on 15 November 2009, after more than two years spent in the Military Medical Academy in Belgrade. Citizens were able to pay tribute to Patriarch Pavle at the Cathedral Church of St. Michael the Archangel in Belgrade. The Divine Liturgy was held on November 19 inside St. Michael's Cathedral (Saborna Crkva), with His All-Holiness, Ecumenical Patriarch Bartholomew presiding, while the funeral service was held outside of Cathedral of Saint Sava and he was laid to rest on 19 November, in Rakovica monastery. The funeral was attended by Ecumenical Patriarch Bartholomew I of Constantinople, Patriarch Daniel of Romania, Filaret, Metropolitan of Minsk and Slutsk, Archbishop Anastasios of Albania, Metropolitan Christopher of Prague and Roman Catholic Cardinal Angelo Sodano.

The Government of Serbia announced three days of national mourning over the death of Patriarch Pavle, while Republika Srpska, City of Belgrade and Brčko District declared the funeral day as the official day of mourning. President Boris Tadić said that the patriarch's death was an "irredeemable loss for the entire Serbian nation." Condolences to the Serbian church, people and officials were sent by Russian Patriarch Kirill I of Moscow, Bulgarian Orthodox Church, Ecumenical Patriarch Bartholomew I of Constantinople and Archbishop Ieronymos II of Athens held memorial service, Patriarch Daniel of Romania, Pope Benedict XVI, Cardinal Walter Kasper, Presidents and heads of Government of Russia, Belarus, Ukraine, Germany and France as well as leaders of countries that are territorially part of the Serbian Orthodox Church - Bosnia and Herzegovina, Croatia, Yugoslav Republic of North Macedonia, Montenegro (President Filip Vujanović). The Jewish community, both Islamic communities in Serbia, the Islamic community in Bosnia, and the Roman Catholic Church in Serbia sent condolences.

He was succeeded by the bishop of Niš Irinej in January 2010.

Awards and honors 
  Grand Cross of the Order of the Star of Karađorđe (by the Karađorđević dynasty), 2007
 Award of the Unity of Orthodox Nations Foundation, 2002 (for 2001)
 Order of the Holy Prince Vladimir Equal to the Apostles of the First Degree (ROC), 2004
 Honorary Doctorate of Divinity (SOC), 1988

See also 
 List of 20th-century religious leaders
 List of 21st-century religious leaders

Notes

References
Books
 
 
 
 
 
 
 
News articles

External links

 
 Serbian Orthodox Church - Patriarch Pavle
 Obituary 
 Patriarch Pavle – Daily Telegraph obituary

1914 births
2009 deaths
People from Magadenovac
Serbs of Croatia
Serbian monarchists
Austro-Hungarian Serbs
Habsburg Serbs
Patriarchs of the Serbian Orthodox Church
Bishops of Raška-Prizren
Bishops of the Serbian Orthodox Church
20th-century Eastern Orthodox bishops
21st-century Eastern Orthodox bishops
National and Kapodistrian University of Athens alumni
Burials at Serbian Orthodox monasteries and churches